RC Havířov is a Czech rugby club based in Havířov. They currently play in the Czech Rugby League.

History
The club was founded in 1966 by Eduard Vaníček and Karel Gaman, two ex-Lokomotiva Ostrava (now Sokol Mariánské Hory) players.

Initially the club had only a youth team, but a senior side was added in 1972.

The club changed its name to the present one in 1998.

Honours
 Extraliga
 2005 3rd, 2012 2nd
 První Liga winner
 2001, 2003, 2010, 2017 
 Czech Cup winner
 2005, 2007, 2008
 Czech Sevens Championship winner
 2004, 2006

Sport in Havířov
Czech rugby union teams
Rugby clubs established in 1966